William Hammill (c.1822 – 1 September 1871) was a merchant and politician in colonial Victoria, a member of the Victorian Legislative Assembly.

Hammill was a partner in a mercantile firm in Calcutta, India, and arrived in Melbourne in January 1853. Hammill married  Mary Rigmaiden.
 
In November 1856, Hammill was elected to the Victorian Legislative Assembly for Wimmera, a position he held until resigning in March 1857.

Hammill died at Springfield, Toorak, Victoria on 1 September 1871.
He was buried in St Kilda Cemetery.

References

 

1820s births
1871 deaths
Members of the Victorian Legislative Assembly
19th-century Australian politicians